Ipochira is a genus of beetles in the family Cerambycidae, containing the following species:

 Ipochira albomaculipennis Breuning, 1966
 Ipochira celebensis Breuning, 1958
 Ipochira enganensis Breuning, 1970
 Ipochira leitensis Breuning, 1970
 Ipochira perlata Pascoe, 1864
 Ipochira philippinarum Aurivillius, 1927

References

Acanthocinini